Hemberg is a hill ridge in Hesse, Germany.

Hills of Hesse